Geomalacus is a genus of large air-breathing land slugs, terrestrial pulmonate gastropod mollusks in the family Arionidae, the roundback slugs.

Etymology 
The Ancient Greek word  means the Earth. The Greek word  means mollusc.

Distribution 
Western Europe

Species
This genus contains the following species:

subgenus Geomalacus
 Geomalacus maculosus Allman, 1843 - Kerry slug

subgenus Arrudia Pollonera, 1890
 Geomalacus anguiformis (Morelet, 1845)
 Geomalacus malagensis Wiktor & Norris, 1991
known by some as Geomalacus moreleti (Hesse, 1884) 
 Geomalacus oliveirae Simroth, 1891

Description 

Animal limaciform, subcylindrical, blunt behind, with a but little developed mucous pore; mantle anterior, close to the head, concealing a shell-plate; a distinct locomotive disk; respiratory orifice on the right anterior margin of the mantle; genital orifice behind and below the right eye-peduncle. Shell-plate calcareous, ovate, small and solid. Jaw costulated; lingual dentition as in Arion.

The main diagnostic feature of the reproductive system differing from genera Arion, Letourneuxia and Ariunculus is, that species in the genus Geomalacus has atrium with diverticulum. The free oviduct is short; the retractor muscle is attached to the spermatheca duct; vas deferens and epiphalus are long.

References
This article incorporates public domain text from reference.

External links
 Patrão C., de Sousa J. T., Jordaens K., Backeljau T., Castilho R. & Leitão A. (2013). "Geomalacus and Letourneuxia (Mollusca, Pulmonata): A Cytogenetic Assessment". Malacologia 56(1-2): 333-338. .

Arionidae
Taxa named by George Allman (natural historian)
Taxonomy articles created by Polbot